McKenzie Dowrick (born 7 March 2000) is an Australian rules footballer who plays for Adelaide in the AFL Women's competition (AFLW), having previously played for the Brisbane and West Coast. She was playing for Subiaco in the West Australian Women's Football League when she was drafted by Brisbane with the 33rd pick in the 2018 AFL Women's draft. 

Dowrick made her debut in the Lions' round 1 game against Greater Western Sydney at Moreton Bay Central Sports Complex on 3 February 2019.

In April 2019, Dowrick was traded to expansion club West Coast.

In June 2021, Dowrick was delisted by West Coast.

In January 2022, Dowrick was signed by Adelaide as a replacement player in place of Deni Varnhagen who was inactive due to refusing to be vaccinated against COVID-19. After making one appearance for the club she was delisted, but later re-drafted with pick #71.

References

External links

2000 births
Living people
Sportswomen from Western Australia
Australian rules footballers from Western Australia
Brisbane Lions (AFLW) players
West Coast Eagles (AFLW) players